Bellapiscis medius,, the twister, is a triplefin fish of the family Tripterygiidae, commonly found around the coast of New Zealand.  Its length is between 5 and 10 cm.

Habitat 
This species is the only triplefin that as an adult lives in intertidal zone habitat. It can be observed in tidal pools and has adapted to survive the changes in temperature, oxygen saturation and levels of water acidity that accompany living in that habitat. The abundance of this fish in tidal pools decreases during the winter months.

Prey 
B. medius feeds on small crustaceans including barnacles, molluscs including snails, and amphipods.

References

medius
Endemic marine fish of New Zealand
Fish described in 1861
Taxa named by Albert Günther